Cannomois is a group of plants in the Restionaceae described as a genus in 1828. The entire genus is endemic to Cape Province in South Africa.

 Species

References

Restionaceae
Poales genera
Endemic flora of South Africa
Flora of the Cape Provinces
Fynbos